Jõgi is an Estonian word and surname meaning "river". 
Notable people with the name include:

Aili Jõgi (1931–2017), Estonian schoolgirl who blew up a Soviet War monument in 1946
Helmer Jõgi (born 1952), Estonian politician
Ülo Jõgi (1921-2007), Estonian war historian, patriot and member of Estonian resistance against the Soviet occupation of Estonia

See also
 

Estonian-language surnames